Marlborough Ridge is a subdivision of Fairhall in Marlborough, New Zealand. It is located directly west of Marlborough Golf Course, and was developed from the late 1990s. Marlborough Ridge Reserve is a small park in the subdivision.

Demographics
It is part of the Woodbourne statistical area.

7023315 had a population of 177 at the 2018 New Zealand census, an increase of 45 people (34.1%) since the 2013 census, and an increase of 126 people (247.1%) since the 2006 census. There were 75 households. There were 87 males and 90 females, giving a sex ratio of 0.97 males per female. The median age was 60.9 years (compared with 37.4 years nationally), with 15 people (8.5%) aged under 15 years, 18 (10.2%) aged 15 to 29, 69 (39.0%) aged 30 to 64, and 75 (42.4%) aged 65 or older.

Ethnicities were 96.6% European/Pākehā and 3.4% Asian ethnicities.

Although some people objected to giving their religion, 49.2% had no religion, 40.7% were Christian, 1.7% were Hindu and 3.4% had other religions.

Of those at least 15 years old, 51 (31.5%) people had a bachelor or higher degree, and 21 (13.0%) people had no formal qualifications. The median income was $44,800, compared with $31,800 nationally. The employment status of those at least 15 was that 72 (44.4%) people were employed full-time, and 24 (14.8%) were part-time.

Notes

Populated places in the Marlborough Region